The 14th Kedah State election was held on 9 May 2018, concurrently with the 2018 Malaysian general election. The previous state election was held on 5 May 2013. The state assemblymen is elected to 5 years term each.

The Kedah State Legislative Assembly would automatically dissolve on 23 June 2018, the fifth anniversary of the first sitting, and elections must be held within sixty days (two months) of the dissolution (on or before 21 August 2018, with the date to be decided by the Election Commission), unless dissolved prior to that date by the Head of State (Sultan of Kedah) on the advice of the Head of Government (Menteri Besar of Kedah).

The state election resulting in a hung parliament, as no parties gained simple majority. Pakatan Harapan (PH) gained a plurality in the election, winning 18 seats but still short of 1 seat for a simple majority win; nevertheless PH were invited by Sultan of Kedah to form the state government. Mukhriz Mahathir, from BERSATU, was sworn in as Menteri Besar on 11 May 2018.

Contenders

Barisan Nasional (BN)  contested all 36 seats in Kedah State Legislative Assembly. Barisan Nasional (BN) linchpin party United Malays National Organisation (UNMO) is to set to contest major share of Barisan Nasional (BN) seats.

Pan-Malaysian Islamic Party (PAS) also contested all 36 seats in Kedah.

Pakatan Harapan have decided to contest all 36 seats in Kedah. On 4 February 2018, Pakatan Harapan has yet to finalize 4 seats. The seats are Guar Chempedak, Pantai Merdeka, Gurun and Kulim. On 26 February 2018, Pakatan Harapan has completed the distribution of seats in Kedah. Malaysian United Indigenous Party (Bersatu) is to set to contest major share of Pakatan Harapan seats. Malaysian United Indigenous Party (Bersatu) will contest in 14 seats while the National Trust Party (Amanah) will have 10 seats. People's Justice Party (PKR) and the Democratic Action Party (DAP) will contest 10 and 2 seats.

Political parties

The contested seats

Election pendulum
The 14th General Election witnessed 18 governmental seats and 18 non-governmental seats filled the Kedah State Legislative Assembly. The government side has 1 safe seat and 3 fairly safe seats. However, none of the non-government side has safe and fairly safe seat.

Results

By parliamentary constituency
Pakatan Harapan won 9 of 15 parliamentary constituency.

Seats that changed allegiance

Aftermath

Kedah BN leader and previous Menteri Besar Ahmad Bashah said that his party accepted their defeat to PH in the election.

The Pakatan Harapan state government led by Mukhriz only lasts 25 months, when in the wake of 2020 Malaysian political crisis, exit of Bersatu MLAs from PH and defection of support from ex-PH members turned independent, resulted in Mukhriz resignation as Menteri Besar. A new state government was formed in a coalition between BN, Perikatan Nasional (Bersatu and PAS) and independent MLAs, with Sanusi Mohd Nor from PAS appointed as the new Menteri Besar on 17 May 2020. Mukhriz and Amiruddin Hamzah was later sacked from Bersatu on 28 May 2020, and they formed a new political party, PEJUANG on August that same year with other ex-Bersatu members.

References

Kedah state elections
Kedah
Kedah